The Belgian Amateur Championship is an annual snooker competition played in the Belgium and is the highest ranking amateur event in the Belgium.

The competition was established in 1984, and was won by Mario Lannoye who would go on to win six of the first eight championships. Lannoye's six championships still stands as a record which he shares with Bjorn Haneveer who won his sixth championship in 2007. Luca Brecel became the youngest winner in the history of championship in 2010 at the age of 14 years.

The championship is currently held by Kevin Hanssens who defeated Kristof Vermeiren 7–2 in the final of the 2019 championship.

Winners

Stats

Finalists

References

Snooker amateur competitions
Snooker in Belgium
Recurring sporting events established in 1984
1984 establishments in Belgium